Zbigniew Żupnik (26 May 1951 – 27 July 2000) was a Polish painter. He studied at the Jan Matejko Academy of Fine Arts in Kraków where his master was Adam Marczyński. He created numerous paintings, drawings and graphics.

Exhibitions 
 Individual:
 1977 – Kraków
 Collective:
 1977 – Kraków, Dyplomaci II (Diplomats II)
 1980 – Kraków, Warsztaty (Workshops)
 1980 – Paryż, L'art des jeunes (Art of the Young People)
 1980 – Łódź, Sztuka młodych (Art of the Young People)

References 

1951 births
2000 deaths
Jan Matejko Academy of Fine Arts alumni
Artists from Kraków
Abstract artists
20th-century Polish painters
20th-century Polish male artists
Polish male painters